Emerito Concepción (born 4 July 1962) is a Filipino sports shooter. He competed in the men's 10 metre air rifle event at the 1992 Summer Olympics.

References

External links
 

1962 births
Living people
Filipino male sport shooters
Olympic shooters of the Philippines
Shooters at the 1992 Summer Olympics
Place of birth missing (living people)
Shooters at the 1994 Asian Games
Shooters at the 1998 Asian Games
Shooters at the 2002 Asian Games
20th-century Filipino people
21st-century Filipino people